Gavin Frost (1930 – 2016) was an occult author, doctor of physics and mathematics, and prominent member of the American esoteric community. He founded the Church and School of Wicca with his wife Yvonne Frost in 1968, and was the Archbishop of the Church of Wicca and a director of the School of Wicca.  He and his wife have written several books on magic and related subjects such as The Magic Power of Witchcraft.

He appeared on national television's Phil Donahue Show, PM Magazine, Tom Snyder's Tomorrow Show and others, at many events serving the Neo-Pagan community such as Stones Rising, Sirius Rising, Pagan Pride Day, and the Starwood Festival, and in newspaper and magazine articles across the United States.

Early life
Frost was born in Aldridge, Staffordshire, England, on 20 November 1930. In 1952, Frost graduated from King's College London with honours, gaining a Bachelor of Science degree in Mathematics, and after completing his post doctoral thesis with the Department of Atomic Energy in Cumbria, he received a Doctorate in Physics & Mathematics.

Career
After he received his doctorate, Frost left Cumbria and moved to Hatfield near London and took a research position with the de Havilland Aircraft Corporation investigating the effects of long wave infrared radiation on missiles. His next position was with Canadair in Montreal, first working on the Canadian missile program, then joining their training and simulation group, a position that allowed him to travel around the world. After moving to California, Frost became the senior project engineer working on the military F-104 radar systems.

Witchcraft
According to Frost, he was initiated in 1951 at the Nine Maidens; the stone circle site in Boskednan, Cornwall. His claims to be initiated have, however, never been confirmed, and prominent Wiccan members have repeatedly asserted that Frost was never initiated into Wicca. After his claimed initiation, his position with the De Havilland placed him in the vicinity of Salisbury Plain, where he investigated the ancient monoliths of Stonehenge and the people who built them, furthering his interest in ancient peoples and the origins of the Old Religion. While with Canadair, a trip to Chile gave him the opportunity to spend four days in a remote village exploring the religious beliefs and experiencing first-hand the powers of healing as practised by their shamans. While working in California, a trip to Milan, Italy allowed him to do some research into the truths and fiction that surrounds Charles G. Leland's Aradia: Gospel of the Witches.

In 1966 he relocated to Munich, Germany as a company representative, and became fascinated with the subject of German sorcery.  He joined a group of Zauberers (Zauberer – German for magician, sorcerer, wizard) operating in der Bayrischen Naehe just south of Munich, became an initiate and qualified to receive and don their saffron robe. Even though not Wiccan, the Frosts claimed the title and founded the Church and School of Wicca in 1968, which in 1972 became the first federally recognised Wiccan church in that country. It was first operated in Missouri, then in North Carolina, and then in West Virginia. The Frosts stepped down as active leaders of the church in 1980, but continued to be active as clergy and as heads of the School of Wicca. The church itself as well as several of the Frosts' publications have repeatedly been criticised for their rituals which many perceive as inappropriate conduct towards children, resulting in numerous public outcries by initiated Wiccans emphasising that apart from using the name, the Frosts' rituals have little in common with Wiccan rituals and lore.

Death
Frost died on 11 September 2016 at the age of 86.

Bibliography
Frost, Gavin (1972). Witchcraft: The Way to Serenity – Esoteric Publishing 
Frost, Gavin and Yvonne Frost (1972). The Witch’s Bible – Nash Publishing 
Frost, Gavin and Yvonne Frost (1976). The Magic Power of Witchcraft – Prentice Hall Press 
Frost, Gavin and Yvonne Frost (1978). Meta-Psychometry: Key to Power & Abundance – Parker Pub Co , 
Frost, Gavin and Yvonne Frost (1979). A Witch's Grimoire of Ancient Omens. Portents, Talismans, Amulets, & Charms – Parker Pub Co , 
Frost, Gavin and Yvonne Frost, Ibn Saud (1980). Helping Yourself with Astromancy – Parker Pub Co 
Frost, Gavin and Yvonne Frost (1980). Power Secrets from a Sorcerer's Private Magnum Arcanum – Parker Pub , 
Frost, Yvonne and Gavin Frost (1985). Astral Travel: Your Guide to the Secrets of Out-of-Body Experiences – Weiser Books; New Ed edition , .
Frost, S. Gavin (1988). The Mariner's Manual – Cornell Maritime Press 
Frost, Gavin and Yvonne Frost (1989). Tantric Yoga: The Royal Path to Raising Kundalini Power – Weiser Books , .
Frost, S. Gavin (1990). The Captain's License Book – Cornell Maritime Pr/Tidewater Pub , 
Frost, Gavin and Yvonne Frost (1991). The Prophet's Bible – Red Wheel Weiser , .
Frost, Gavin (1992). Who Speaks for the Witch – Godolphin House , 
Frost, Gavin (Editor)(1992). Witch Words – Godolphin House , 
Frost, Gavin and Yvonne Frost (1999). Good Witch's Bible – Godolphin House; Reprint edition , .
Frost, Gavin and Yvonne Frost (1999). Magic Power of White Witchcraft Revised – Prentice Hall Press; Revised edition , .
Frost, Gavin and Yvonne Frost (2000). The Witch's Magical Handbook – Prentice Hall Press , .
Frost, Gavin and Yvonne Frost (2002). The Witch's Book of Magical Ritual – Reward Books  
Frost, Gavin and Yvonne Frost (2003).  A Witch's Guide to Psychic Healing: Applying Traditional Therapies, Rituals, and Systems – Red Wheel/Weiser , .
Frost, Gavin and Yvonne Frost (2004). The Solitary Wiccan – Weiser Books , .
Frost, Gavin and Yvonne Frost (2006). Good Witches Fly Smoothly: Surviving Witchcraft – Outskirts Press ,

Notes

References
 Bond, Lawrence & Ellen Evert Hopman (1996) People of the Earth: The New Pagans Speak Out (reissued as Being a Pagan: Druids, Wiccans & Witches Today in 2002 Destiny Books ) Interview.
 De Puymaigre, Théodore Folk-lore (1960) Indian Publications (Original from the University of Michigan)
 Dunwich, Gerina The Modern Witch's Complete Sourcebook
 Jarboe, Michelle (9 April 2007) Wiccans Gather to Celebrate Faith News-Record.com article
 Rabinovitch, Shelley and James Lewis The Encyclopedia of Modern Witchcraft and Neo-Paganism

External links
Biography from the Church and School of Wicca
Interview with Pagan News
The Way of the Witch Article on the Church and School of Wicca in Renaissance Magazine
Gavin and Yvonne website

1930 births
2016 deaths
Alumni of King's College London
English Wiccans
People from Aldridge
Wiccan writers